Profundiconus robmoolenbeeki is a species of sea snail, a marine gastropod mollusk in the family Conidae, the cone snails and their allies.

Like all species within the genus Profundiconus, these cone snails are predatory and venomous. They are capable of "stinging" humans, therefore live ones should be handled carefully or not at all.

Description
The length of the shell attains 23.7 mm.

Distribution
This marine species occurs in the Pacific Ocean off the Solomon Islands.

References

 Tenorio M.J. (2016). Profundiconus robmoolenbeeki spec. nov.: A new deep water conoidean gastropod from the Solomon Islands (Gastropoda, Conilithidae). Basteria. 80(1–3): 89–94

External links
 

robmoolenbeeki
Gastropods described in 2016